María Fernanda Herazo González (born 22 March 1997) is a Colombian professional tennis player.

Herazo has won ten singles and 16 doubles titles on the ITF Women's Circuit. On 24 September 2018, she reached her best singles ranking of world No. 317. On 29 July 2019, she peaked at No. 220 in the WTA doubles rankings.

Playing for Colombia Fed Cup team, Herazo has a win–loss record of 9–12.

ITF Circuit finals

Singles: 15 (10 titles, 5 runner-ups)

Doubles: 35 (16 titles, 19 runner-ups)

References

External links
 
 
 

1997 births
Living people
Sportspeople from Barranquilla
Colombian female tennis players
Tennis players at the 2014 Summer Youth Olympics
Tennis players at the 2015 Pan American Games
Tennis players at the 2019 Pan American Games
Central American and Caribbean Games medalists in tennis
Central American and Caribbean Games gold medalists for Colombia
Pan American Games competitors for Colombia
20th-century Colombian women
21st-century Colombian women